Northside Independent School District is a public school district located in northern Wilbarger County, Texas. The district's school campus Northside School is located on U.S. Highway 283, 10 miles north of Vernon, Texas.

Northside ISD is a small, rural school district with one school campus serving all students in grades K-12. The district was created in 1936 following the consolidation of several smaller schools. The current school building was constructed in 1942 after the original school was destroyed by fire a year earlier.

Academic achievement

In 2009, the school district was rated "academically acceptable" by the Texas Education Agency.

Special programs

Athletics
The Northside Indians won their first state championship ever in six-man football in 2006.

See also

List of school districts in Texas

References

External links
Northside ISD

School districts in Wilbarger County, Texas